Ronald Hertog (born 13 January 1989 in Moordrecht, now merged into Zuidplas) is a Dutch amputee and Paralympic javelin thrower. He was selected to be his nation's flag-bearer at the 2012 Summer Paralympics.

References

External links
Ronald Hertog's website
Profile 

People from Zuidplas
1989 births
Living people
Paralympic athletes of the Netherlands
Athletes (track and field) at the 2008 Summer Paralympics
Athletes (track and field) at the 2012 Summer Paralympics
Athletes (track and field) at the 2020 Summer Paralympics
Paralympic bronze medalists for the Netherlands
Dutch amputees
Paralympic medalists in athletics (track and field)
Medalists at the 2012 Summer Paralympics
Sportspeople from South Holland
Dutch male javelin throwers
Dutch male sprinters
Javelin throwers with limb difference
Sprinters with limb difference
Paralympic javelin throwers
Paralympic sprinters
21st-century Dutch people